"One Step" is a song by English band Kissing the Pink, released as both a 7" and 12" single from their third studio album, Certain Things Are Likely (1986). Produced by Peter Walsh, "One Step" was released as the lead single from the album, peaking at No. 79 on the UK Singles Chart, and No. 5 on Billboard's Dance Club Songs chart. It also reached the Top 40 in Belgium, Italy and the Netherlands. The single features two tracks from their previous album What Noise (1984), "The Rain It Never Stops" and "Footsteps" as its B-side.

Despite the song's relative lack of success in the UK, it was performed on Top of the Pops.

Track listing
7" single
"One Step"
"Footsteps"

12" single
"One Step"
"The Rain It Never Stops"
"Footsteps"

Chart performance

References

External links
 

Kissing the Pink songs
1986 singles
1986 songs